Joran Vliegen (born 7 July 1993) is a Belgian tennis player. Vliegen has a career high ATP doubles ranking of World No. 28 achieved on 14 June 2021. He also has a career high singles ranking of World No. 508 achieved on 1 August 2016. Vliegen won two singles titles on the ITF Men's Circuit, but now focuses on doubles. Vliegen has claimed 6 ATP tour doubles titles with partner Sander Gillé.

Early life and background 
Vliegen was born in Maaseik, Belgium to parents Ivo Vliegen and Annick Desender. He has a brother named Warre. He started playing tennis at the age of five. In 2011 he moved to the United States to play college tennis at East Carolina University. He was named 2014 Conference USA Player of the Year. He earned undergraduate and graduate degrees in business.

Career

2018: Davis Cup debut 
Vliegen made his debut with the Belgium Davis Cup team in 2018. In the quarterfinals against the United States, he and fellow Belgian Sander Gillé lost against Ryan Harrison and Jack Sock.

2019: Grand Slam debut and first quarterfinal , Three ATP doubles titles
In 2019 he and Gillé managed to pull off a surprise win over Brazil's Marcelo Melo and Bruno Soares in the Belgium-Brazil Davis cup tie contributing to Belgium qualifying for the 2019 Davis Cup Finals held in November.

Vliegen made his Grand Slam debut in the 2019 French Open. Partnering Mikhail Kukushkin from Kazakhstan he managed to reach the quarterfinals. At Wimbledon 2019, Vliegen made his debut in a mixed doubles event, and reached the third round with Zheng Saisai from China.

Vliegen won his first ATP Tour doubles title at the 2019 Swedish Open with fellow Belgian Sander Gillé. One week later, again partnering with Gillé, he also won the title at the  Swiss Open. The duo continued their winning streak by reaching the final of the Austrian Open, losing to Philipp Oswald and Filip Polášek. Two months later, Vliegen and Gillé picked up their third title of 2019 at the Zhuhai Championships.

2020-2021: Two titles, Second Major quarterfinal, first Masters semifinal, Olympics & top 30 debut
Vliegen won two more titles with his partner Sander Gillé at the 2020 Astana Open and at the 2021 Singapore Open.
They also reached the quarterfinals at the 2020 US Open (tennis) losing to the eventual runners-up Mektic/Koolhof, their best showing at the Grand Slam thus far.
The pair made their first Masters 1000 semifinal at the 2021 Mutua Madrid Open losing to the 2nd seeded pair of Pavic/Mektic. As a result, Vliegen reached a career-high of No. 31 on 10 May 2021.

2022: First Grand Slam mixed doubles final
At the 2022 French Open, Vliegen and Gillé caused an upset by eliminating the defending champions and home favorites Pierre Hugues Herbert and Nicolas Mahut in three tight sets without dropping one service game. In the second round they saw off the Australian pairing of Luke Saville and Jordan Thompson before falling to the unseeded pairing of Rafael Matos and David Vega Hernández in a third super match tie-break. 

He also entered the mixed doubles event for the first time, partnering Norwegian Ulrikke Eikeri. In the first round they won against the Kazakh pairing of Anna Danilina and Andrey Golubev in three sets. In the second round they progressed past the home team of Clara Burel and Hugo Gaston in straight sets. In the third round they faced 2021 Wimbledon champions Desirae Krawczyk and Neal Skupski and lost the first set comprehensively before bouncing back to win the second set in the tie-break and the third set match tie-break. Their semifinal followed a similar pattern, this time against 2018 Wimbledon champion Nicole Melichar and twice French Open Men's doubles champion Kevin Krawietz, with them again bouncing back from a poor first set to win the second in the tie-break and the third set match tie-break to reach their first Grand Slam final. They lost in the final to Ena Shibahara and Wesley Koolhof. This made Vliegen the first Belgian man to reach the final of a mixed doubles event of a Grand Slam tournament.

Significant finals

Grand slam finals

Mixed doubles: 1 (runner-up)

ATP career finals

Doubles: 8 6 titles, 2 runner-ups)

Challenger and Futures Finals

Singles: 3 (2–1)

Doubles: 51 (37–14)

Performance timelines

Doubles

Current through the 2022 French Open.

Mixed doubles
Current through the 2022 Australian Open.

References

External links

 
 
 
 
 
 

1993 births
Living people
Belgian male tennis players
Olympic tennis players of Belgium
East Carolina University alumni
Tennis players at the 2020 Summer Olympics
College men's tennis players in the United States
People from Maaseik
Sportspeople from Limburg (Belgium)
21st-century Belgian people